Thomas Patrick John Anson, 5th Earl of Lichfield (25 April 1939 – 11 November 2005) was an English photographer from the Anson family. He inherited the Earldom of Lichfield in 1960 from his paternal grandfather. In his professional practice he was known as Patrick Lichfield.

Biography 

Thomas Patrick John Anson was born on 25 April 1939. He was the only son of Lieutenant-Colonel Thomas William Arnold Anson, Viscount Anson (1913–1958), the eldest son and heir apparent of Thomas Edward Anson, 4th Earl of Lichfield (1883–1960). His mother was born Anne Bowes-Lyon (1917–1980), a niece of Queen Elizabeth The Queen Mother. His parents divorced in 1948, and his mother subsequently became Princess Anne of Denmark after her remarriage to Prince George Valdemar of Denmark in 1950. He had one sister, Elizabeth Georgiana (1941–2020), who married Sir Geoffrey Adam Shakerley, 6th Baronet Shakerley.

Lichfield was educated at two boarding independent schools: Wellesley House School in the coastal town of Broadstairs in Kent, and Harrow School in Harrow on the Hill in north-west London, followed by the Royal Military Academy Sandhurst.

His father died in 1958, leaving Patrick to succeed as 5th Earl of Lichfield when his grandfather died in 1960.

Lichfield joined the Grenadier Guards in 1959. On leaving the Army in 1962, he began to work as a photographer's assistant, and built up his own reputation, partly as a result of having access to the Royal Family. He was selected to take the official photographs of the wedding of the Prince and Princess of Wales in 1981, and subsequently became one of the UK's best-known photographers. From 1999 onwards he was a pioneer of digital photography as a professional standard. He was chosen by Queen Elizabeth II and the Duke of Edinburgh to take official pictures of her Golden Jubilee in 2002.

In 2003, he made a cameo appearance in the BBC medical drama series Casualty for a story about raising money for Children in Need. He also cameoed in the British sitcom Keeping Up Appearances, appearing in the episode "Sea Fever" as a passenger on the Queen Elizabeth 2.

Lichfield resided in an apartment at the former family seat of Shugborough Hall, near Cannock Chase in Staffordshire. In 1960 he had given the estate to the National Trust in lieu of death duties arising on his grandfather's death.

Marriage and children

On 8 March 1975 Lichfield married Lady Leonora Grosvenor, elder daughter of Robert Grosvenor, 5th Duke of Westminster, and Viola Grosvenor, Duchess of Westminster. They were divorced in 1986. The Countess of Lichfield has not remarried and has retained her title. She and the Earl had one son and two daughters together:

 Lady Rose Meriel Margaret Anson (born 27 July 1976), a goddaughter of Princess Margaret
 Thomas William Robert Hugh Anson, 6th Earl of Lichfield (born 19 July 1978); he married Lady Henrietta Conyngham, daughter of Henry Conyngham, 8th Marquess Conyngham, in December 2009. They have two sons.
 Lady Eloise Anne Elizabeth Anson (born 1981); she married Louis Alexander Philip Waymouth on 7 September 2013. They have two children.

Lichfield's most recent partner was the biographer Lady Annunziata Asquith, daughter of Julian Asquith, 2nd Earl of Oxford and Asquith.

Death 

On 10 November 2005, Lichfield suffered a major stroke and died the following day at the John Radcliffe Hospital in Oxford. He was 66 years old.

Lichfield's funeral was held on 21 November at St Michael and All Angels Church, Colwich, Staffordshire, where he was buried in the family vault.

Since 2011, the private apartments at Shugborough have housed an exhibition of Lichfield's work. His cameras and lighting gear have been set up in a re-creation of his studio, and there is a gallery of some of his most famous photographic subjects.

Bibliography
 Lichfield on Photography. London: Collins, 1981.
 The Most Beautiful Women. London: Elm Tree, 1981.
 A Royal Album. London: Elm Tree, 1982.
 Creating the Unipart Calendar. London: Collins, 1983.
 Hotfoot to Zabriskie Point (with Jilly Cooper). London: Constable, 1985.
 Not the Whole Truth: an autobiography. London: Constable, 1986.
 Lichfield on Travel Photography. London: Constable, 1986.

References

External links
A selection of Lichfield's images 1964–1980
Lichfield: The Early Years 1962–1982 exhibition at the National Portrait Gallery, 2003
BBC News article on his death
BBC News Obituary
The Royal Family Genealogy: Thomas Patrick John Anson of Lichfield
Memorial Service for Lord Lichfield

1939 births
2005 deaths
Burials in Staffordshire
5th Earl of Lichfield
English photographers
Grenadier Guards officers
Graduates of the Royal Military Academy Sandhurst
People educated at Harrow School
Patrick
Lichfield